The following is a list of Major League Baseball players, retired or active.

La through Lh

References

External links
Last Names starting with L – Baseball-Reference.com

 La-Lh